Eilema fuscipes is a moth of the subfamily Arctiinae first described by George Hampson in 1893. It is found in Sri Lanka.

References

fuscipes